Africotriton carinapex is a species of sea snail, a marine gastropod mollusk in the family Cancellariidae, the nutmeg snails. It is found off the coast of New South Wales, Australia.

Description

References

Cancellariidae
Gastropods described in 1987